Graf Cagliostro ('Count Cagliostro') is a comic opera in two acts by Mikael Tariverdiev, written in 1981 to a libretto by Nikolai Kemarsky, after the tale of the same name by Alexei Nikolayevich Tolstoy.

Tolstoy's novella, based on the quack Cagliostro, was updated by composer and librettist so that it impinges on the modern world, (and uses modern musical style). Tariverdiev wrote:

Roles

Recording
Moscow Chamber Theatre, conducted by Vladimir Agronsky. Bomba Music, Russia 2003 (2 CDs)

Notes

Operas
1981 operas
Russian-language operas
Opera buffa
Cultural depictions of Alessandro Cagliostro
Operas based on novels